Woodrow Hamilton (born December 20, 1992) is an American football nose tackle who is a free agent. He played college football at Ole Miss.

College career
Hamilton played in 47 games with 25 starts at nose tackle and finished with 83 tackles and three sacks and one pass defensed for Mississippi. As a senior, he started all 12 games and totaled 29 tackles and one sack.

Professional career

New England Patriots
Hamilton was signed by the New England Patriots as an undrafted free agent following the 2016 NFL Draft. On September 3, 2016, he was released by the Patriots as part of final roster cuts and was signed to the practice squad the next day. He was promoted to the active roster on October 8, 2016. On December 21, he was released by the Patriots and was re-signed to the practice squad. On February 5, 2017, Hamilton's Patriots appeared in Super Bowl LI. In the game, the Patriots defeated the Atlanta Falcons by a score of 34–28 in overtime.

On February 7, 2017, Hamilton signed a futures contract with the Patriots. On September 2, 2017, Hamilton was waived/injured by the Patriots and placed on injured reserve. He was released with an injury settlement on September 4.

New Orleans Saints
On October 10, 2017, Hamilton was signed to the New Orleans Saints' practice squad. He was promoted to the active roster on January 10, 2018.

On September 1, 2018, Hamilton was waived by the Saints and was signed to the practice squad the next day. He was released on September 27, 2018.

New York Giants
On December 12, 2018, Hamilton was signed to the New York Giants practice squad.

Carolina Panthers
On December 31, 2018, Hamilton signed a reserve/future contract with the Carolina Panthers. He was waived during final roster cuts on August 30, 2019. He was re-signed to the active roster on November 27, 2019.

On September 5, 2020, Hamilton was waived by the Panthers and signed to the practice squad the next day. He was elevated to the active roster on September 19 for the team's week 2 game against the Tampa Bay Buccaneers, and recovered a fumble in the game. He reverted to the practice squad after the game. He was signed to the active roster on October 17. He was waived on November 7, 2020. Hamilton re-signed to the practice squad on November 10. On December 12, 2020, Hamilton was signed to the active roster. He was released on February 12, 2021.

Tennessee Titans
Hamilton signed with the Tennessee Titans on April 23, 2021. He was waived on August 31, 2021, and re-signed to the practice squad. He was signed to the active roster on October 1, 2021. He was waived on October 12.

New York Giants (second stint)
On October 20, 2021, Hamilton was signed to the New York Giants practice squad. He was released on October 26. He was re-signed on December 14. His contract expired when the teams season ended on January 9, 2022.

References

External links
Ole Miss Rebels bio
New England Patriots bio

1992 births
Living people
American football defensive tackles
People from Raleigh, Mississippi
Players of American football from Mississippi
Ole Miss Rebels football players
New England Patriots players
New Orleans Saints players
New York Giants players
Carolina Panthers players
Tennessee Titans players